Joey Meneses Ramirez (born May 6, 1992) is a Mexican professional baseball first baseman and outfielder for the Washington Nationals of Major League Baseball (MLB). He has previously played in Nippon Professional Baseball (NPB) for the Orix Buffaloes. He was the 2018 International League MVP.

Professional career

Atlanta Braves
Meneses played for several farm teams of the Atlanta Braves from 2011 through 2017. 

After the 2013, 2014, and 2015 seasons, he played for Tomateros de Culiacán of the Mexican Pacific League (LMP). In 2016, Meneses first reached the Double-A level, playing for the Mississippi Braves. After the 2016 season, he played for Tomateros of the LMP. 

For the 2017 season with Mississippi, he registered a .292 batting average with 9 home runs and 45 RBIs in 108 games; he was also a mid-season Southern League all star. He was named an MILB.com Organization All Star in 2014 and 2017. On November 6, 2017, Meneses became a free agent. After the 2017 season, he played for Tomateros of the LMP.

Philadelphia Phillies
The Philadelphia Phillies signed Meneses to a minor league contract on February 1, 2018. He spent the 2018 season with the Triple-A Lehigh Valley IronPigs. He went on to win the 2018 International League MVP, registering a .311 batting average with 23 home runs and 82 RBIs in 130 games. On October 29, 2018, Meneses was released by the Phillies. He subsequently signed to play in Japan for 2019. After the 2018 season, he played for Tomateros of the LMP.

Orix Buffaloes
On October 29, 2018, Meneses signed a one-year contract worth an estimated 100 million yen, equivalent to approximately US $950,000, with the Orix Buffaloes of Nippon Professional Baseball. On March 29, 2019, he made his NPB debut. On June 27, 2019, Meneses was suspended for 12 months after testing positive for the banned substance hydroxystanozolol. That same day, he became a free agent. After the 2019 season, he played for Tomateros of the LMP.

Boston Red Sox
On January 23, 2020, Meneses signed a minor league deal with the Boston Red Sox. After the 2020 minor league season was canceled, he was re-signed by the Red Sox in early November to a minor-league deal. After the 2020 season, he played for Tomateros de Culiacán of the LMP. He was assigned to the Portland Sea Dogs of Double-A Northeast to begin the 2021 season, and was promoted to the Worcester Red Sox of Triple-A East in early August. He elected free agency on November 7, 2021.

Washington Nationals
On January 13, 2022, Meneses signed a minor league deal with the Washington Nationals. On August 2, 2022, after trading outfielder Juan Soto and first baseman Josh Bell to the San Diego Padres, the Nationals called up Meneses from the Triple-A Rochester Red Wings, and he made his major league debut against the New York Mets. Meneses hit a home run off of Yoan López to lead off the seventh inning for his first major league hit. Meneses went 0 for 4 the next game, but subsequently embarked on an 11 game hitting streak, and continued to hit well throughout August, putting up a slash line of .354/.385/.626 and hitting seven home runs through his first 25 games in the majors. On September 1, Meneses hit a walk-off home run against the Oakland Athletics which gave the Nationals their first walk-off win of the year. On September 16, with the Nationals down 4–0 to the Miami Marlins, Meneses hit an inside-the-park home run and later scored the winning run in a 5–4 Washington victory. 

He finished the season batting .324 with a .367 on-base percentage, .563 slugging percentage, 13 home runs, and 34 RBI. Meneses was named to the MLB Pipeline All-Rookie Team.

International career
Meneses has played for Mexico in the Caribbean Series of 2015, 2018, 2020, 2021, and 2022.

In February 2019, Meneses was selected to the Mexico national baseball team for 2019 exhibition games against Japan.

Meneses was selected for a second time to the national team in the 2020 Summer Olympics (contested in 2021), in Tokyo.

In 2023, Meneses played for Mexico in the World Baseball Classic, hitting two home runs in a game against the United States in pool play.

Personal life
Meneses has stated that he is big fan of Goku, and it was one reason why he joined a Japanese team.

References

External links

1992 births
Living people
Baseball players at the 2020 Summer Olympics
Baseball players from Sinaloa
Baseball players suspended for drug offenses
Carolina Mudcats players
Dominican Summer League Braves players
Mexican expatriate baseball players in the Dominican Republic
Gulf Coast Braves players
Lehigh Valley IronPigs players
Major League Baseball first basemen
Major League Baseball players from Mexico
Mexican expatriate baseball players in Japan
Mexican expatriate baseball players in the United States
Mexican sportspeople in doping cases
Mississippi Braves players
Nippon Professional Baseball first basemen
Nippon Professional Baseball right fielders
Olympic baseball players of Mexico
Orix Buffaloes players
Portland Sea Dogs players
Rochester Red Wings players
Rome Braves players
Sportspeople from Culiacán
Tomateros de Culiacán players
Washington Nationals players
Worcester Red Sox players
2023 World Baseball Classic players